SMK Damansara Utama is a secondary school situated in Petaling Jaya, Selangor, Malaysia. It was awarded the Cluster School of Excellence status in 2009 by the Malaysian Ministry of Education.

History 
The construction of the school began in 1987 and was completed in December 1988. The school officially opened to its first batch of students on 3 January 1989.

School emblem
 "Berfikir Asas Kebijaksanaan": printed in black, emphasises the importance of thinking skills to succeed.
 Paddy : the staple food of Malaysians that guarantees health and well-being of students.
 Year 1989/1409: the opening of SMK Damansara Utama.
 Flaming torch: symbolises courage, firmness and discipline that is instilled in SMKDU.
 A betel leaf
 The colours of the school emblem are the colours of the Malaysian flag.
 The book, three circles and a serrated wheel shows the determination and perseverance of the students of SMK Damansara Utama in gaining knowledge to achieve

Publishing

School Magazine
Titled Memori, it is published yearly.

Achievements
 Sekolah Kluster Kecemerlangan Kementerian Pendidikan Malaysia
 Anugerah Sekolah Harapan Negara - Runner Up
 The Young Entrepreneur(YE) program won the Best Company and Best Report award in 2010.
 Sports Achievement; Basketball class of 2009 led by Melvin Ong, Edward Kee, Jian Ming Chip, won five U18 Championship Trophies from the period of 2007-2009

Information
 Students use the term DUrians to refer SMK Damansara Utama students. It is unknown when this tradition was started as it has been around prior to 2003, contrary to as previously claimed. Coincidentally, Durians also referred to as the King of fruits for which Malaysia is famous for.
 The students come in earlier than most working people. The first bell rings at 7.20 a.m. and the call is made at 7.15 a.m. indicating the students to be ready at the assembly area. Classes start at 7.30 a.m.
 The first batch of students in this school were invited from mainly two primary schools i.e. SRK Damansara Utama and SRK Damansara Jaya. Students who did not opt to join SM Damansara Utama mostly continued their studies at SMK Damansara Jaya. For this reason, the students from both high schools compete in sport and academic subjects.
 In 2008, the former Senior Assistant (until 2007), Datin Norizan was promoted to Principal of SMK Damansara Jaya (retired in 2010).
 Classrooms for Secondary 1-3 (lowerclassmen) are named after flowers (Anggerik, Cempaka, Dahlia, Kiambang, Meranti and Teratai) and classrooms for Secondary 4-5 (upperclassmen) are named after hardwood trees (Belian, Jati, Cengal, Keruing, Meranti, and Penaga).

References

External links
 
 Prefectorial Board 99/00 - http://members.tripod.com/~DUPrefects/index-2.htm

Schools in Selangor
Secondary schools in Malaysia
Petaling Jaya